Triptych is the debut album by a free improvisation trio consisting of Danish saxophonist Lotte Anker and two American musicians: pianist Craig Taborn and drummer Gerald Cleaver. The trio had its inception in 2003, when a European tour came up and Marilyn Crispell, Anker and Cleaver's regular partner, was unable to participate. The album was released on the English Leo label.

Reception

The Penguin Guide to Jazz describes the album as "very impressive, with Anker playing long, looping lines that seem to weave in and out of Taborn's typically subtle and inflected piano. The real discovery of the set, though, is Cleaver, who plays melodically and with a faultless sense of space."

Track listing
All compositions by Anker/Taborn/Cleaver
 "Triptych" – 13:35
 "Lotuseating" – 2:09
 "Cumulus" – 12:00
 "Mr. Yin and Mr. Yan" – 3:51
 "The Hierophant" – 9:41
 "1. Act" – 6:44
 "Frog Floating" – 7:27

Personnel
Lotte Anker – tenor sax, soprano sax
Craig Taborn – piano
Gerald Cleaver - drums

References

2005 albums
Lotte Anker albums
Leo Records albums